The Crown Heights riot was a race riot that took place from August 19 to August 21, 1991, in the Crown Heights section of Brooklyn, New York City. Black residents attacked Orthodox Jewish residents, damaged their homes, and looted businesses. The riots began on August 19, 1991, after two children of Guyanese immigrants were accidentally struck by a car running a red light while following the motorcade of Rebbe Menachem Mendel Schneerson, the leader of Chabad, a Jewish religious movement. One child died and the second was severely injured.

In the immediate aftermath of the fatal accident, Black youths attacked several Jews on the street, seriously injuring several and fatally injuring an Orthodox Jewish student from Australia. Over the next three days, the rioters looted stores and attacked Jewish homes. Two weeks after the riot, a non-Jewish man was killed by a group of Black men; some believed that the victim had been mistaken for a Jew. The riots were a major issue in the 1993 mayoral race, contributing to the defeat of Mayor David Dinkins, an African American. Opponents of Dinkins said that he failed to contain the riots, with many calling them a "pogrom" to emphasize what they said was the role of the New York City government.

Ultimately, Black and Jewish leaders developed an outreach program between their communities to help calm and possibly improve racial relations in Crown Heights over the next decade.

Causes

Car crash
At approximately 8:20 pm on Monday, August 19, 1991, Yosef Lifsh, 22, was driving a station wagon with three passengers west on President Street, part of the three-car motorcade of Rabbi Menachem Mendel Schneerson, leader of the Chabad Lubavitch Hasidic movement. The procession was led by an unmarked police car with two officers, with its rooftop light flashing.

The police car and Schneerson's automobile crossed Utica Avenue on a green light and proceeded along President Street at a normal speed, but Lifsh's vehicle had fallen behind. Not wishing to lose sight of Schneerson's car, Lifsh crossed Utica Avenue on a red light. There was no indication of the exact speed of his vehicle. Lifsh's vehicle struck a car being driven on Utica Avenue, veered onto the sidewalk, knocked a 600-pound (275 kg) stone building pillar down and pinned two children against an iron grate covering the window of a first-floor apartment in a four-story brick building. Seven-year-old Gavin Cato, the son of Guyanese immigrants, who was working on his bicycle chain while on the sidewalk near his apartment on President Street, died instantly. His seven-year-old cousin Angela Cato, who was playing nearby, survived but was severely injured.

Lifsh believed he had the right of way to proceed through the intersection because of the police escort. Lifsh later said that the car did not come to a full stop when it hit the building, but slid to the left along the wall and hit  the children.

Death of Gavin Cato
Accounts differ as to the next sequence of events. After the collision, Lifsh said that the first thing he did was to try to lift the car in order to free the two children beneath it. Members of the EMS unit, who arrived on the scene about three minutes after the accident, said that Lifsh was being beaten and pulled out of the station wagon by three or four men. A volunteer ambulance from the Hatzolah ambulance corps arrived on the scene at about 8:23 pm, followed by police and a City ambulance. The latter took Gavin Cato to Kings County Hospital, arriving at 8:32 pm; Cato was pronounced dead shortly thereafter. Volunteers from a second Hatzolah ambulance helped Angela Cato, until a second City ambulance arrived and took her to the same hospital.

Two attending police officers, as well as a technician from the City ambulance, directed the Hatzolah driver to remove Lifsh from the scene for his safety, while Gavin Cato was being removed from beneath the station wagon. According to The New York Times, more than 250 neighborhood residents, mostly black teenagers, many of whom were shouting "Jews! Jews! Jews!", jeered the driver of the car and turned their anger on the police.

Some members of the community were outraged because Lifsh was taken from the scene by a private ambulance service while city emergency workers were still trying to free the children who were pinned under the car. Some believed that Gavin Cato died because the Hatzolah ambulance crew was unwilling to help non-Jews. There was a rumor at the time that Lifsh was intoxicated. A breath alcohol test administered by police within 70 minutes of the accident indicated this was not the case. Other rumors circulating shortly after the accident included: Lifsh was on a cell phone, Lifsh did not have a valid driver's license, and that police prevented people, including Gavin Cato's father, from assisting in the rescue of the children.

Later that evening, as the crowds and rumors grew, people threw bottles and rocks. Someone reportedly shouted, "Let's go to Kingston Avenue and get a Jew!" A number of black youths set off westward toward Kingston Avenue ( away from Utica Avenue), a street of predominantly Jewish residents several blocks away, vandalizing cars, and throwing rocks and bottles as they went.

Riots and murders

Yankel Rosenbaum killing
About three hours after the riots began, early on the morning of August 20, a group of approximately 20 young black men surrounded Yankel Rosenbaum, a 29-year-old Jewish University of Melbourne student in the United States conducting research for his doctorate. They stabbed him several times in the back and beat him severely, fracturing his skull. Before being taken to the hospital, Rosenbaum identified 16-year-old Lemrick Nelson Jr. as his assailant in a line-up shown to him by the police. Rosenbaum died later that night because the doctor did not notice a stab wound in his chest. Nelson was charged with murder as an adult; he was acquitted at trial.

Following that trial, Australian attorney Norman Rosenbaum became an advocate for his late brother, inspiring protests that included a shutdown of the Brooklyn Bridge and a demonstration at Gracie Mansion, the mayor's official residence.

Nelson later was convicted in federal court of violating Rosenbaum's civil rights and was sentenced to 10 years in prison. Nelson eventually admitted that he had stabbed Rosenbaum.

Rioting
For three days following the accident, numerous African Americans and Caribbean Americans of the neighborhood, joined by growing numbers of non-residents, rioted in Crown Heights. In the rioting of the ensuing three days, according to Edward Shapiro, many of the rioters "did not even live in Crown Heights."

During the riots, Jews were injured, stores were looted, and cars and homes were damaged. The rioters identified Jewish homes by the mezuzot affixed to the front doors.

An additional 350 police officers were added to the regular duty roster on August 20 and were assigned to Crown Heights in an attempt to quell the rioting. After episodes of rock- and bottle-throwing involving hundreds of blacks and Jews, and after groups of blacks marched through Crown Heights chanting "No Justice, No Peace!", "Death to the Jews!", and "Whose streets? Our streets!", an additional 1,200 police officers were sent to confront rioters in Crown Heights.

On the third day of the disturbances, Al Sharpton and Sonny Carson led a march. The marchers proceeded through Crown Heights carrying antisemitic signs and burning an Israeli flag. Rioters threw bricks and bottles at police; shots were fired at police and police cars were pelted and overturned, including the Police Commissioner's car.

Riots escalated to the extent that a detachment of 200 police officers was overwhelmed and had to retreat for their safety. On August 22, over 1,800 police officers, including mounted and motorcycle units, had been dispatched to stop the attacks on people and property.

By the time the three days of rioting ended, 152 police officers and 38 civilians were injured, 27 vehicles were destroyed, seven stores were looted or burned, and 225 cases of robbery and burglary were committed. At least 129 arrests were made during the riots, including 122 blacks and seven whites. Property damage was estimated at one million dollars.

Related shooting murder
On September 5, two weeks after the riot had been controlled, Anthony Graziosi, an Italian sales representative with a white beard dressed in dark business attire, was driving in the neighborhood. As he stopped at a traffic light at 11 pm, six blocks away from where Yankel Rosenbaum had been murdered, a group of four black men surrounded his car and one of them shot and killed him. It was alleged by Graziosi's family and their attorney, as well as Senator Al D'Amato, Senator Daniel Patrick Moynihan, State Attorney General Robert Abrams, former Mayor Ed Koch, and a number of advocacy organizations, that Graziosi's resemblance to a Hasidic Jew precipitated his murder. The New York Police Department, Mayor Dinkins, newspaper columnist Mike McAlary, and the U.S. Justice Department did not agree. The murder was not treated as a hate crime.

Viewpoints
After the death of Gavin Cato, members of the black community believed that the decision to remove Lifsh from the scene first was racially motivated. They also said that this was one example of a perceived system of preferential treatment afforded to Jews in Crown Heights. The preferential treatment was reported to include biased actions by law enforcement and uneven allocations of government resources, amongst others. Many members of the black community were concerned that the number of Jews in the community had increased and that they were buying all of the property in the crowded area.

An interview with Rabbi Shmuel Butman, published in 1991, mentions a police directive to Hatzolah to transport Lifsh, along with Jews already injured by rioters, without transporting either of the Cato children. "We did exactly what the police officers wisely advised us." Based on protesters' statements and actions during the rioting, Butman said, "We were always hoping that after World War II no Jew would ever be killed just for being Jewish, but this is what happened in the city of New York." In his eulogy at the funeral, the Rev. Al Sharpton referred to "diamond dealers" (a Jewish business) and said, "It's an accident to allow an apartheid ambulance service in the middle of Crown Heights."

A writer for City Journal criticized the news media for downplaying the role of antisemitism in the riots, noting various antisemitic displays, such as a banner displayed at the funeral of Cato that said, "Hitler did not do the job". Edward S. Shapiro, a historian at Seton Hall University, later described the riot as "the most serious anti-Semitic incident in American history" and published a book about it in 2006. He notes that there are many interpretations of what happened:

Court case
A grand jury composed of 10 black, 8 white, and 5 Hispanic jurors found no cause to indict Lifsh. Brooklyn District Attorney Charles J. Hynes explained that under New York law, the single act of "losing control of a car" is not criminal negligence, even if death or injury resulted. Lifsh waived immunity and testified before the grand jury. About an hour after hearing Lifsh's testimony, the grand jury voted not to indict him. Subsequently, Lifsh moved to Israel, where his family lives, because he claimed his life was threatened. In Israel, Lifsh settled in the Lubavitch village of Kfar Chabad.

Afterwards, Hynes fought unsuccessfully for the public release of the testimony that the grand jury had heard. His lawsuit was dismissed, and the judge noted that more than three-quarters of the witnesses who had been contacted refused to waive their right to privacy. The judge also expressed concern for the witnesses' safety.

Aftermath

Impact on the 1993 mayoral race
The Crown Heights riot contributed to the defeat of David Dinkins in his second mayoral bid. He was attacked by many political adversaries in his reelection bid, including vocal proponents of "black nationalism, back-to-Africa, economic radicalism, and racial exclusiveness."

Girgenti Report
On November 17, 1992, New York Governor Mario Cuomo gave the Director of Criminal Justice Services, Richard H. Girgenti, the authority to investigate the rioting and the Nelson trial. The Girgenti Report was compiled by over 40 lawyers and investigators. The 656-page document, dated July 1993, is available through a website of the Washington, DC-based Police Foundation, which prefaces the report with a disclaimer that the "review does not seek to put blame on any entity for what happened..."

The report was extremely critical of Police Commissioner Lee Brown. The report also criticized Mayor Dinkins for poor handling of the riots. However, the report found no evidence to support the most severe charge against Dinkins and Brown: that they had purposely delayed the police response in order to allow rioters to "vent" their rage.

The first night of the riot, Dinkins, along with Police Commissioner Brown, both African Americans, went to Crown Heights to talk to the community to dispel the rumors about the circumstances surrounding the accident. They had no appreciable influence on the rioters, most of whom were young black men.

In a 16-minute speech on the Thanksgiving holiday following the riot, Dinkins rebutted allegations that he had prevented police from protecting citizens in Crown Heights. The Jewish community believed Dinkins failed to contain the riot and failed to exercise his responsibility, to their detriment.

Use of the term "pogrom"
The Crown Heights riot was an important issue that was raised repeatedly on the campaign trail in the 1993 mayoral election. According to Edward S. Shapiro, politicians opposed to Mayor Dinkins used the word "pogrom" to characterize the riot in order to discredit the mayor's response to the riot, writing "the controversy over how to define the Crown Heights riot was not merely an issue of semantics."

Rudy Giuliani, who would be elected as the next mayor of New York, referred to the Crown Heights riot as a "pogrom" on July 1, 1993, in a speech at Bay Ridge, Brooklyn: "You can use whatever word you want, but in fact for three days people were beaten up, people were sent to the hospital because they were Jewish. There's no question that not enough was done about it by the city of New York. One definition of pogrom is violence where the state doesn't do enough to prevent it." Other political opponents to Dinkins used the term, including Ed Koch, who had been defeated by Dinkins in the 1989 Democratic mayoralty primary, and Andrew Stein, a candidate in the 1993 Democratic mayoral primary. The term had been used previously in 1991 by journalists such as A. M. Rosenthal in The New York Times and Eric Breindel in the New York Post, and politicians such as New York City Councilman Noach Dear and later by Judah Gribetz, president of the JCRC of New York. By September 1991, it had become routine within Jewish circles to describe the riot as a pogrom. Some Jews continued to use this term for the riot a decade later, as shown by articles in publications such as Jewish Week, The Jerusalem Post, The Forward and The Jewish Press; others went further and called it "America's Kristallnacht".

Use of the word was rejected by Dinkins and his supporters, primarily on the basis that a pogrom by definition is state-sponsored. Dinkins said "To suggest that this is [a pogrom] is not to contribute to the resolution of the problem but to exacerbate tensions and problems that are there." Dinkins was personally offended by the use of "pogrom" since it insinuated that the riot was state-sanctioned and that he personally was an antisemite. "I am incensed by it... [it is] patently untrue and unfair."

Michael Stanislawski, Professor of Jewish History at Columbia University, wrote in 1992 that it was "historically inaccurate" to couple "pogrom" with Crown Heights, because the word denoted organized violence against Jews "having some sort of governmental involvement." Journalists also disagreed with the use of the term, including Joyce Purnick in The New York Times, Earl Caldwell in the New York Daily News, and an article in The City Sun. Rev. Al Sharpton said that Giuliani was engaged in "race-baiting" by using the word "pogrom." Henry Siegman and Marc D. Stern of the American Jewish Congress also publicly rejected use of the term to refer to the riot.

In 2011, shortly before the twentieth anniversary of the riots, an editorial in The Jewish Week wrote: "A divisive debate over the meaning of pogrom, lasting for more than two years, could have easily been ended if the mayor simply said to the victims of Crown Heights, yes, I understand why you experienced it as a pogrom."

Ethnic relations
Prior to the riots, Eastern Parkway divided the Black community in northern Crown Heights and the Jewish community in southern Crown Heights. Efforts aimed at the improvement of the relations between Black people and Jews in Crown Heights began almost immediately following the rioting. Brooklyn Borough President Howard Golden summoned the leaders of each of the ethnic communities to Borough Hall within days after the riots ended, creating what became known as the Crown Heights Coalition. The Coalition, led by Edison O. Jackson, then President of Medgar Evers College, and Rabbi Shea Hecht, chairman of the Board of the National Committee for Furtherance of Jewish Education (NCFJE), operated for ten years as an inter-group forum in which to air neighborhood concerns and work out issues. Golden used the Coalition to initiate interracial projects designed to promote dialogue. One project involved sending a Jewish leader and a Black leader together in a pair to public intermediate and high schools in the area to answer questions from the children about each other's cultures.

A week after the riots, Hatzolah helped repair an ambulance of a Black-owned volunteer service. The following year, the Brooklyn Children's Museum held an exhibit on the contributions made by Black people and Jews in New York. In 1993, the Rev. Jesse Jackson was active in promoting improved Black-Jewish relations. In 1993, a series of neighborhood basketball games were scheduled between the two groups, including a scrimmage held as part of the halftime entertainment of a New York Knicks vs. Philadelphia 76ers professional basketball game. Also that year, Rabbi Israel Shemtov, whose anti-crime patrol had long been perceived by many Black residents as biased against them, rushed to the aid of a Black woman who had been shot on the street in Crown Heights, putting her in his car and taking her to the hospital. The Crown Heights Mediation Center was established in 1998 to help resolve local differences, also a direct outcome of the Coalition.

Anniversary commemorations
On August 19, 2001, a street fair was held in memory of Cato and Rosenbaum, and their relatives met and exchanged mementos in hopes of healing in Crown Heights. Again in 2016, family members Carmel Cato and Norman Rosenbaum planned to meet together to commemorate their loss.

Twenty years after the riot, a Manhattan synagogue invited Sharpton to participate in a panel discussion marking the anniversary. Norman Rosenbaum, brother of the murdered Yankel Rosenbaum, was outraged, saying inviting Sharpton to speak was "an absolute disgrace" and that his "vile rhetoric incited the rioting." He added that Sharpton "did absolutely nothing then to improve black-Jewish relations — and nothing since." Sharpton expressed regret for some aspects of his involvement. He insisted that his marches were peaceful, although his language and tone "sometimes exacerbated tensions."

In a 2019 speech to a Reform Jewish gathering, Sharpton said that he could have "done more to heal rather than harm". He recalled receiving a call from Coretta Scott King at the time, during which she told him "sometimes you are tempted to speak to the applause of the crowd rather than the heights of the cause, and you will say cheap things to get cheap applause rather than do high things to raise the nation higher".

Demographics
To this day, the demographic trends of Crown Heights remain largely the same as in 1991. Jews did not flee from Crown Heights, and the Lubavitch population of Crown Heights increased after the riot, leading to an expansion of the area in which they reside.

In popular culture

 On the sketch comedy show In Living Color, the 1991 season 3 premiere episode featured a sketch parodying West Side Story called Crown Heights Story. The skit was cut from the DVD release.
Anna Deavere Smith interviewed more than 100 people directly and indirectly associated with the riot, and created her play Fires in the Mirror (1992), which premiered the following year in New York. The one-woman show featured Smith playing the roles of numerous public and private figures, having drawn quotes from the transcripts of her interviews. 
 A 2004 television movie, Crown Heights, was made about the aftermath of the riot, starring Howie Mandel.
 A fictionalized version of the riots appeared in Law & Order.
 Brooklyn Babylon, a feature film starring Tariq "Black Thought" Trotter and The Roots, presents a fictionalized version of Crown Heights neighborhood unrest in the 1990s.

See also
 List of incidents of civil unrest in New York City
 List of incidents of civil unrest in the United States
 New York City teachers' strike of 1968 – which took place immediately to the east of Crown Heights in Brownsville and was another chapter in African-American—Jewish relationships.

References

Further reading
 Conaway, Carol B. "Crown Heights: Politics and Press Coverage of the Race War That Wasn't." Polity (1999): 93–118. in JSTOR
 Goldschmidt, Henry. Race and Religion among the Chosen Peoples of Crown Heights (Rutgers University Press, 2006) excerpt
Shapiro, Edward S. "Interpretations of the Crown Heights riot." American Jewish History (2002) 90#2 pp: 97–122. online
Shapiro, Edward S. Crown Heights: Blacks, Jews, and the 1991 Brooklyn Riot (U. Press of New England, 2006) link online

1991 in Judaism
1991 in New York City
1991 politics in New York (state)
1991 crimes in the United States
1991 riots
August 1991 events in the United States
August 1991 crimes
African American–Jewish relations
Anti-Jewish pogroms
Antisemitic attacks and incidents in the United States
Antisemitism in New York (state)
Chabad history
Crimes in Brooklyn
Ethnic riots
Jewish-American history
Jews and Judaism in New York City
Menachem Mendel Schneerson
African-American riots in the United States
Religiously motivated violence in the United States
Riots and civil disorder in New York City
Crown Heights, Brooklyn
Race-related controversies in the United States
1990s in Brooklyn